Edward Tarletski, (also known as Norma Pospolita and Madame Zhu–Zhu, born 5 February 1969) is a Belarusian drag performer, recording artist, entertainer, journalist, gay activist, and costume designer, living in Stockholm, Sweden. He was born in Minsk, Belarus on 5 February 1969. Edward Tarletski graduated as a photographer and a journalist in European Humanities University (Minsk) in 1996.  Since 2000, he has been a member of the Belarusian Association of Journalists.

Life in Belarus 

In 1990, Tarletski was one of two people who hunger striked for returning the Church of Saints Simon and Helena building to the Catholic community in Minsk.

Between 1993–1998, Tarletski work edas a journalist for the Radio Free Europe/Radio Liberty and as an editor of youth programming at the Belarusian state television station; at the same time he published articles in the Belarusian Catholic magazine "Nasha vera" (Our faith).

Edward Tarletski was the first Belarusian person to publicly come out in 1998. In the same year, he founded BELARUS LAMBDA LEAGUE, the first LGBT organization in Belarus.

On 19 April 1999, Tarletski organized the first ever gay public action in Belarus, when LGBT rights activists demonstrated to protest the authorities' refusal to register their organization. Edward Tarletski told RFE/RL that the Belarusian authorities are guided by Soviet stereotypes in their unwillingness to recognize the existence of a "non-traditional sexual orientation" in Belarus. Tarletski added that the demonstrators also wanted to protest a recent seminar organized by the Belarusian Exarchate of the Russian Orthodox Church at which some participants called homosexuals "servants of the devil" and proposed punishing them by electrocution.

Two years later, during the action "Gays against Fascism", which took place on 3 July 2001 in the memorial complex to victims of Holocaust "Yama" in Minsk, Traletski stated:At the public action "Gays against fascism" which was held at memorial "Maly Trostenets extermination camp" during the Belarus Gay Pride in Minsk on 5 September 5, 2001, Edward Tarletski said:

In 1998 – 2005, Tarletski published and edited Belarusian LGBT magazines FORUM LAMBDA and TABOO.

Between 1999–2002, Edward Tarletski held the position of Chairman of the Organizing Committee of Belarus Gay Pride (Minsk Pride) festivals.

In 2005, Edward Tarletski started his career as a drag entertainer in the LGBT club named Babylon in Minsk, Belarus.

Life in Ukraine 
Being politically persecuted in Belarus, Tarletski moved to Ukraine in 2008, when he played the role of DIVA in the cult Russian movie Chapiteau-Show which won the prize of the XXXIII Moscow Film Festival. After that, Edward Tarletski focused on a career as a drag entertainer and later, he founded the famous Ukrainian drag queen contest ″MISS DIVA″ in 2013. In February 2014, Edward Tarletski as Madame Zhu-Zhu took part in TV show "Zvana Vecherya" (Ukrainian version of the My Kitchen Rules), episodes 46–50 Being a popular artist in night clubs of Ukraine, in 2015, Tarletski has participated as a drag performer in the music video ″WINGS″ Surrender album of the British duo Hurts. 2015 he applied for political asylum in Ukraine, but his demand was refused. In 2018 he moved to Sweden.

Life in Sweden 
Since 2018 Tarletski has lived in Stockholm, Sweden, where he participates in the protest movement against the government of Alexander Lukashenko.

Filmography

Television credits

References

1974 births
Belarusian dissidents
Living people
Free speech activists
Community activists
Drag queens
Gay actors
Gay comedians
Gay musicians
Radio Free Europe/Radio Liberty people
Journalists from Minsk
Belarusian activists
Musicians from Minsk
Belarusian human rights activists
Belarusian male actors
Ukrainian comedy musicians
Ukrainian television presenters
Ukrainian pop singers
Ukrainian performance artists
Belarusian LGBT people
Ukrainian LGBT rights activists
20th-century LGBT people
21st-century LGBT people